Kina can refer to:
 Kina (animal), a sea urchin endemic to New Zealand
 Kina (musician), American singer/songwriter, and former member of musical group Brownstone
 Kina, an Italian music producer known for the single "Get You the Moon"
 Kina (name), other people named "Kina"
 Papua New Guinean kina, the currency of Papua New Guinea
 Kina, the name of China in the Albanian, Greek, Danish, Norwegian, Macedonian, Serbo-Croatian, Icelandic, and Swedish languages
 Kina, a character in The Black Company
 Kina, a brand of candy from Fazer
 KINA, a radio station in Salina, Kansas

See also
 Photokina, a trade fair for the photographic and imaging industries in Cologne